Afdhere Jama (born 1980) is an American writer and filmmaker of Somali origin.

Jama was born and raised in Somalia. He moved to America when he was a teenager.  Between the years 2000 and 2010, he was the editor of Huriyah. Jama identifies as queer and Muslim.

In June 2016, after a shooting in Orlando, an article Jama had written in 2014 about LGBT Muslims was shared on social media.

Huriyah

Jama was the editor in chief of Huriyah ("freedom"), an LGBT Muslim magazine published between the years 2000 and 2010. It was based in San Francisco, California. Huriyah used the slogan "Queer Muslim Magazine".

The magazine was first published in Arabic and 2002 the magazine launched in English, with a focus on both LGBT and Muslim issues in politics, arts, and spirituality. It had a major interview every month, conducted by Jama, and the diverse personalities included Daayiee Abdullah, Faisal Alam, Surina Khan, Sulayman X and many others.

Films
 Hearts (2015)
 Angelenos (2013) 
 Bits (2012) 
 Over the Rainbow (2011) (segment "Carlita") 
 Apart (2010) 
 From Here To Timbuktu (2010) (segment "Trio") 
 Rebound (2009) 
 Ani (2009) 
 Berlinsomnia (2008)
 Shukaansi (2007)

Books

 Being Queer and Somali: LGBT Somalis At Home and Abroad (2015)
 Queer Jihad: LGBT Muslims on Coming Out, Activism, and the Faith (2013)
 Illegal Citizens: Queer Lives in the Muslim World (2008)
 At Noonday with the Gods of Somalia (2004)

Articles
 "Out in Beirut". Whosoever magazine.
 "Reading Shahnameh in Paris". Iranian.com.
 "Soul Mates: The Price of Being Gay in Somalia". Afrol magazine.
 "Living On A Prayer: Muslims & Hiv/AIDS". Positive Nation magazine.
 "Ashnas and Mehboobs: An Afghan Love Story". Trikone magazine.

Notes

References

External links
Huriya Magazine Blog by Afdhere Jama

American male journalists
American filmmakers
American Muslims
Somalian emigrants to the United States
American male poets
American gay writers
Somalian LGBT people
LGBT Muslims
Living people
Somalian writers
1980 births
21st-century American poets
21st-century American male writers
21st-century LGBT people